On 12 September 2012 at about 12:20 local time (00:20 UTC), Petropavlovsk-Kamchatsky Air Flight 251, operated by an Antonov An-28, crashed while attempting to land at Palana Airport in Russia.
Both pilots were killed, together with 8 of the 12 passengers. All 4 survivors were in serious condition. The aircraft descended below minima on approach in instrument meteorological conditions and impacted a forested slope. On July 6, 2021, an Antonov An-26 assigned to the same flight route and number also crashed while on its approach to land at Palana Airport.

Aircraft

The aircraft was a twin-turboprop Antonov An-28, registration RA-28715, built in 1989 with serial number 1AJ006-25.

Investigation
An investigation by the Interstate Aviation Committee revealed that both pilots were intoxicated by alcohol and that the plane was "far off course". The final report identified as contributing factors a low level of crew discipline and inadequate supervision by the airline, the inaction by the crew following the altimeter alarm for low altitude, and the aircraft's lack of a ground proximity warning system.

References

External links
 Interstate Aviation Committee investigation page: English and Russian

Aviation accidents and incidents in 2012
Aviation accidents and incidents in Russia
Aviation accidents and incidents caused by pilot error
Accidents and incidents involving the Antonov An-28
2012 disasters in Russia
Transport in Kamchatka Krai
Aviation in the Russian Far East
Disasters in the Russian Far East
September 2012 events in Russia